Biksēre Manor, also previously known as Libe Manor, is a manor house in the historical region of Vidzeme, in northern Latvia. The estate has a large 14.7-hectare park with 26 sculptures, and an antiques museum has been installed in the stone barn. The manor building currently houses the Sarkaņi parish administrative offices and library.

See also
List of palaces and manor houses in Latvia

References

External links
  Biksēre (Libe) Manor
  Sarkaņi Parish
 

Manor houses in Latvia